is a Japanese colloquial term typically used to describe early teens who have grandiose delusions, who desperately want to stand out, and who have convinced themselves that they have hidden knowledge or secret powers. It translates to "second year syndrome" (i.e., middle-school second-year). It is sometimes called "eighth-grader syndrome" in the United States, usually in the context of localizations of anime which feature the concept as a significant plot element.

History
The term was used by Hikaru Ijūin in 1999. He described the childish aspirations of elementary school students as if it were some kind of syndrome he had contracted. Ijūin made a statement disavowing the idea in 2009, as it had changed from a light-hearted remark to a condition that was studied seriously in psychology. In 2008, Hyōya Saegami wrote a book called , or "Chūnibyō User Manual", in which he identifies three types of chūnibyō: "DQN", who act like delinquents; "subculture", who go against the mainstream trends; and "evil eye", who aspire to have special powers.

Legacy
Literary critic Boshi Chino expressed that he would like to give the novel Don Quixote the subtitle "Chūnibyō Starting from 50 Years Old" from the vicious cycle observable within the work characterized by "the protagonist's viewing of the world through colored glasses" causing "the people around him to play along in order to avoid denying his delusions, but in the end only causing the protagonist to succumb more and more to those delusions".

See also
 Adolescence
 Adultism
 Anti-social behaviour
 Cognitive bias
 Personal fable
 Peter Pan Syndrome

References

Colloquial terms
1990s neologisms
Anime and manga terminology
Japanese words and phrases
Age-related stereotypes